The Academy of Gondishapur (Farhangestân-e Gondišâpur), also known as the Gondishapur University (دانشگاه گندی‌شاپور Dânešgâh-e Gondišapur), was one of the three Sasanian centers of education (Ctesiphon, Ras al-Ayn, Gundeshapur) and academy of learning in the city of Gundeshapur, Iran during late antiquity, the intellectual center of the Sasanian Empire. It offered education and training in medicine, philosophy, theology and science. The faculty were versed in Persian traditions. According to The Cambridge History of Iran, it was the most important medical center of the ancient world during the 6th and 7th centuries.

Under the Pahlavi dynasty, the heritage of Gondeshapur was memorialized by the founding of the Jondishapur University and its twin institution Ahvaz Jundishapur University of Medical Sciences, near the city of Ahvaz in 1955. After Iranian revolution in 1979, the university was renamed to Shahid Chamran University of Ahvaz but the twin institution kept its name Jundishapur.

History
In  489, the East Syriac Christian theological and scientific center in Edessa was ordered closed by the Byzantine emperor Zeno, and was transferred and absorbed into the School of Nisibis in Asia Minor, also known as Nisibīn, then under Persian rule. Here, Nestorian scholars, together with Hellenistic philosophers banished from Athens by Justinian in 529, carried out important research in medicine, astronomy, and mathematics.

However, it was under the rule of the Sassanid emperor Khosrau I ( 531-579), known to the Greeks and Romans as Chosroes, that Gondeshapur became known for medicine and learning. Khosrau I gave refuge to various Greek philosophers and Syriac-speaking Nestorian Christians fleeing religious persecution by the Byzantine empire. The Sassanids had long battled the Romans and Byzantines for control of present-day Iraq and Syria and were naturally disposed to welcome the refugees.

Emperor Khosrau I commissioned the refugees to translate Greek and Syriac texts into Pahlavi. They translated various works on medicine, astronomy, philosophy, and useful crafts.

A Church of the East monastery was established in the city of Gondishapur sometime before 376/7. By the 6th century the city became famed for its theological school where Rabban Hormizd once studied.
According to a letter from the Catholicos of the East Timothy I, the Metropolitanate of Beth Huzaye took charge of both the theological and medical institutions.

Although almost all the physicians of the medical academy were Persians, yet they wrote their treatises in Syriac, because medicine had a literary tradition in Syriac.

Significance of Gondeshapur 

In addition to systemizing medical treatment and knowledge, the scholars of the academy also transformed medical education; rather than apprenticing with just one physician, medical students were required to work in the hospital under the supervision of the whole medical faculty. There is even evidence that graduates had to pass exams in order to practice as accredited Gondeshapur physicians (as recorded in an Arabic text, the Tārīkh al-ḥukamā). Gondeshapur also had a pivotal role in the history of mathematics.

Gondeshapur under Muslim rule 
In 832 AD, Caliph al-Ma'mūn bolstered the famous House of Wisdom. There the methods of Gondeshapur were emulated; indeed, the House of Wisdom was staffed with graduates of the older Academy of Gondeshapur. It is believed that the House of Wisdom was disbanded under Al-Mutawakkil, al-Ma'mūn's successor.

However, by that time the intellectual center of the Abbasid Caliphate had definitively shifted to Baghdad, as henceforth there are few references in contemporary literature to universities or hospitals at Gondeshapur. The significance of the center gradually declined. Al-Muqaddasi's Best Divisions for Knowledge of the Regions (c. 1000 AD) described Gondeshapur as falling into ruins.

The last known head of Gundeshapur's hospital died in 869.

Famous physicians of Gondeshapur
 Borzūya
 Bukhtishu
 Masawaiyh
 Sarakhsi
 Sabur ibn Sahl
 Nafi ibn al-Harith

Modern Gondeshapur

Under the Pahlavi dynasty, the heritage of Gondeshapur was memorialized by the founding of the Jondishapur University and its twin institution Jondishapur University of Medical Sciences, near the city of Ahvaz in 1955.

The latter-day Jondishapur University of Medical Sciences was founded and named after its Sassanid predecessor, by its founder and first Chancellor, Dr. Mohammad Kar, Father of Cyrus Kar, in Ahvaz in 1959.

Jondishapur University was renamed to Shahid Chamran University of Ahvaz in 1981 in honor of Mostafa Chamran.
It has been renamed again as Ahvaz Jundishapur University of Medical Sciences recently.

The first woman to be appointed as vice-chancellor in a university in Iran, Dr. Tal'at Basari, was appointed at this university in the mid-1960s, and starting 1968, plans for the modern campus were designed by famed architect Kamran Diba.

Ancient Gondeshapur is also slated for an archaeological investigation. Experts from the Archaeological Research Center of Iran's Cultural Heritage Organization and the Oriental Institute of the University of Chicago plan to start excavations in early 2006.

See also

 Nezamiyeh

Notes

References
 The Cambridge History of Iran, Vol 4, 
 
 Dols, Michael W. "The origins of the Islamic hospital: myth and reality"  Bulletin of the. History of Medicine, 61:3: 1987,  pp 367–90
 Frye, Richard Nelson. The Golden Age of Persia,  Weidenfeld & Nicolson, 1993.
 Hau, Friedrun R. "Gondeschapur: eine Medizinschule aus dem 6. Jahrhundert n. Chr.," Gesnerus, XXXVI (1979), 98-115.
 Piyrnia, Mansoureh. Salar Zanana Iran. 1995. Maryland: Mehran Iran Publishing.
Hill, Donald. Islamic Science and Engineering. 1993. Edinburgh Univ. Press.

External links
 Medicine in ancient Iran
 Jondishapur according to Ahvaz University
 Gundishapur according to jazirehdanesh(In Persian)
 imam khomeini hospital(Gundishapur medical center)

Gondishapur, Academy of
Gondishapur, Academy of
Ancient universities
Gondeshapur
Hospitals established in the 6th century
History of Khuzestan Province
6th-century establishments in Asia
Education in Khuzestan Province
Khosrow I